Demay may refer to:

People with the surname
Coralie Demay (born 1992), French cyclist
Layla Demay (born 1971), French journalist and writer

Places
Demay, Alberta, a locality in Alberta, Canada
Demay Point, a headland of King George Island, South Shetland Islands